Michael Anthony Rayner  (born 17 February 1956) is an Australian architect and urban designer. He was a director of Cox Rayner Architects (now Cox Architecture) for 33 years before commencing a new practice Blight Rayner Architecture in 2016. He has led the designs of many major Australian public buildings often with expressed structure. He is an adjunct professor at the University of Queensland and a Life Fellow and Past President of the Australian Institute of Architects in Queensland. He was appointed a Member of the Order of Australia in 2011. He was elected as a Fellow of the Australian Academy of Technology and Engineering in 2009.

Early years and education 
Rayner was born in Sydney on 17 February 1956. He grew up in a street adjoining the houses of such noted architects as Bryce Mortlock, Peter Keys and John Fisher. From observing their work as a child, Rayner determined early on to become an architect.

Rayner attended North Sydney Boys High School and undertook his architecture studies at the University of New South Wales, graduating with First Class Honours in 1980 and winning the 1980 Thesis Medal in Architecture. He was awarded the Australian Institute of Architects Byera Hadley Travelling Scholarship in 1989, studying urban waterfront renewal.

Early career 
After graduating, Rayner joined Philip Cox and Partners working closely with Cox for the next ten years and designing such noted public buildings as the Australian National Maritime Museum and the Sydney Exhibition Centre (now demolished) in Darling Harbour .

Ensuing career 
Rayner moved to Brisbane in 1990 and established Cox Rayner Architects. He designs using the overarching ethos of structure, craft, art and nature as guidelines for all projects, large or small.

Rayner left the Cox practice in 2016 to establish Blight Rayner Architecture as a smaller firm where he could devote more time to thinking about the future of architecture and of cities, and to hands-on designing of buildings. In 2019, the firm won the international competition to design the New Performing Arts Venue at Brisbane's South Bank and subsequently the National Rugby Training Centre at Ballymore.

Rayner was a speaker at the Affirmative Architecture Brisbane 2014 symposium.

Positions 

Rayner was appointed a Order of Australia Member(AM) in 2011. He is a past Queensland President of the Australian Institute of Architects (2000 – 2002) and was a Creative Director of the institute's National Convention in 2012. He was a member of the Queensland Premier's Smart State Council (2006 – 2012) and Queensland Design Council (2009 – 2012).

Rayner is an adjunct professor at the University of Queensland (2009 -) and he chairs Griffith University’s Architecture Industry Advisory Board. He is a long-term member of the Queensland Government’s Urban Design and Places Panel.

Rayner is a Fellow of the Australian Academy of Technology and Engineering (ATSE) and a Life Fellow of the Australian Institute of Architects. He is on the Queensland State Board of Advisors of the Property Industry Foundation.

Rayner was a juror for the World Architecture Festival Awards in Singapore in 2014 and 2015.

Notable projects

Planning and urban design 
Although primarily an architect, Rayner worked on the Brisbane CBD Planning Strategy in 1995 and subsequently prepared the master plan for Newstead-Teneriffe (1996), Brisbane's largest urban waterfront redevelopment. His ‘Smart Cities: Rethinking the City Centre’ was a 2006 study proposing a series of pedestrian bridges constructed and forthcoming. In 2006, Rayner was involved in a workshop entitled Tabula Rasa which was held to reflect in the city's possible futures. He has produced the master plans for Griffith University’s Nathan and Logan campuses, and for Singapore’s Marina Bay.

Personal life 
Rayner married Kylie Broad in 1996. They have two sons Hugh and Lachlan. Rayner is an avid art collector and philanthropist. He donated 97 works from his collection to The University of Queensland Art Museum in 2015.

Further reading 

 AAP Directories, 2019. Who’s who in Australia 2020. Sydney: AAP Directories, a division of Australian Associated Press.
 Dewhirst, D. and Ward, M., 2014. From the ground up: 20 stories of a life in architecture. Melbourne: Uro Publications.
 Rayner, Michael, 2018. “Double vision for city” The Courier Mail. October 18.
 Thompson, Shane, Skinner, Peter, and Rayner, Michael, 2012. Experience. Experience: 2012 National Architecture Conference, Brisbane, QLD, Australia, 10–12 May 2012.

External links 

 Blight Rayner official website.
 Beck, Haig, and Jackie Cooper, 2013. “Australian Age of Dinosaurs Museum” Architecture AU. July 9.     Accessed June 2, 2021.
 Bleby, Michael, 2019. “Tzannes, Blight Rayner design new Charter Hall-WSU Engineering Innovation Hub” Australian Financial Review. February 12, 2019.     
 Blundell, L, 2009. “GPT’s Eagle Street tower – banking on demand for premium and green” The Fifth Estate. December 16. Accessed June 2, 2021.
 Gallery of Modern Art. 2015. “GOMA Talks Queensland | Who Are We: Defining A State” QAGOMA. August 21. Accessed June 3, 2021.
 Johnson, Nathan. 2014. "Cox Rayner Architects design state-of-the-art Velodrome for 2018 Gold Coast     Commonwealth Games" Architecture &     Design. June 16. Accessed June 2, 2021.
 Architecture and Design, 2018. “Top architectural trends for 2018.” Architecture and     Design. January 25. Accessed June 4, 2021.
 Queensland Design Council, 2011. Flood Inquiry Submission. April 8. Accessed June 4, 2021.
 Queensland State Archives, 2021. “The Queensland Cultural Centre: then, now and new” Livestream. March 13. Accessed June 3, 2021.

References 

1956 births
Living people
21st-century Australian architects
Fellows of the American Institute of Architects
Members of the Order of Australia